Incorrigible (French: L'Incorrigible) is a 1975 French comedy film directed by Philippe de Broca and starring Jean-Paul Belmondo, Geneviève Bujold and Capucine.

Plot
Victor Vauthier, a lovable rogue and mythomaniac who does not want to give up his ways, leaves prison, causing great sadness to his guards, who had come to like him during his three-month imprisonment. He immediately pulls off a series of thefts and frauds. Meanwhile, he has to report to his parole officer, Marie-Charlotte Pontalec. Victor and Marie-Charlotte immediately hit it off. This does not prevent Victor, encouraged by his father figure, uncle Camille, from trying to profit from his proximity to Marie-Charlotte in order to steal a triptych by El Greco. The picture is located in the Senlis Museum, where Marie-Charlotte's father works as a custodian. However, she ends up figuring out Victor's plan.

Main cast
 Jean-Paul Belmondo as Victor Vauthier
 Geneviève Bujold as Marie-Charlotte Pontalec
 Julien Guiomar as Camille
 Charles Gérard as Raoul
 Daniel Ceccaldi as Chief of Police
 Capucine as Hélène
 Andréa Ferréol as Tatiana Negulesco
 Michel Beaune as Minister
 Albert Simono as M. Pontalec
 Pascale Roberts as Adrienne
 Maria Meriko as Mme Florinda
 Dora Doll as Thérèse, barkeep
 Anémone as Prostitute
 Marc Dudicourt as Ministry Guard
 Roger Riffard as Second Taxi Driver
 Maurice Travail as Finances Official

References

Discography
The soundtrack was composed by Georges Delerue, and made available on CD by Music Box Records.

External links

Incorrigible at le Film Guide

1975 comedy films
1975 films
Films scored by Georges Delerue
Films directed by Philippe de Broca
Films set in museums
French comedy films
1970s French-language films
French heist films
Films with screenplays by Michel Audiard
1970s heist films
1970s French films